Martina Vigil Montoya (1856–1916) was a Native American ceramics painter from San Ildefonso Pueblo, New Mexico. She frequently collaborated with her husband and partner Florentino Montoya. They introduced new techniques and materials to other potters. Julian Martinez often copied their designs and in 1895 Maria Martinez called Martina the finest contemporary potter. They moved from San Ildefonso to Cochiti Pueblo, the birthplace of Martina's father, between 1902 and 1905. While the bentonite slip employed in Cochiti pottery gave it a soapy appearance, Southwestern ceramics expert Jonathan Batkin considers the Montoyas' work from this period to be stylistically San Ildefonso. She's known for being the primary instructor of her niece Tonita Peña.

References

Further reading
 
 Specimen in Fenimore Art Museum
 Polychrome wedding vessel at Adobe Gallery

1856 births
1916 deaths
People from San Ildefonso Pueblo, New Mexico
Native American painters
Native American potters
Pueblo artists
Native American women artists
Ceramics decorators
20th-century indigenous painters of the Americas
20th-century American women artists
American women ceramists
American ceramists
American women painters
20th-century Native Americans
20th-century Native American women
19th-century Native Americans
19th-century Native American women